Wouter Gudde (born 5 August 1984) is a Dutch former footballer.

Club career
Gudde is a defender who was born in Schiedam and made his debut in professional football, being part of the Sparta Rotterdam squad in the 2004–05 season.

External links
 Player profile – RKC Waalwijk
 Career stats – Voetbal International 

1984 births
Living people
Footballers from Schiedam
Directors of football clubs in the Netherlands
Dutch footballers
Sparta Rotterdam players
RKC Waalwijk players
Eredivisie players
Eerste Divisie players
Excelsior Rotterdam players
Association football defenders